Adrian Prosser (born 28 July 1956) is a Canadian former cyclist. He competed in the team pursuit event at the 1976 Summer Olympics.

References

External links
 

1956 births
Living people
Canadian male cyclists
Olympic cyclists of Canada
Cyclists at the 1976 Summer Olympics
Sportspeople from Hemel Hempstead